Robert D. Fleming (March 8, 1903 – August 15, 1994) was a member of the Pennsylvania State Senate who served from 1951 to 1974.  He also served in the Pennsylvania House of Representatives.

External links

References

People from Sharpsburg, Pennsylvania
Republican Party Pennsylvania state senators
Presidents pro tempore of the Pennsylvania Senate
Republican Party members of the Pennsylvania House of Representatives
1903 births
1994 deaths
20th-century American politicians